The Skyhooks Tapes is the first compilation album by Australian band Skyhooks, released in September 1977. The album features all the band's A- and B-side singles and peaked within the top 50 in Australia.

Background
In February 1977, Red Symons left the band and was replaced on guitar by Bob Spencer. The band continued to tour nationally, promoting their three studio albums.

Track listing

Charts

References

Skyhooks (band) albums
Compilation albums by Australian artists
1977 greatest hits albums
Mushroom Records compilation albums